Satellite images (also Earth observation imagery, spaceborne photography, or simply satellite photo) are images of Earth collected by imaging satellites operated by governments and businesses around the world. Satellite imaging companies sell images by licensing them to governments and businesses such as Apple Maps and Google Maps.

History 

The first images from space were taken on sub-orbital flights. The U.S-launched V-2 flight on October 24, 1946, took one image every 1.5 seconds. With an apogee of 65 miles (105 km), these photos were from five times higher than the previous record, the 13.7 miles (22 km) by the Explorer II balloon mission in 1935. The first satellite (orbital) photographs of Earth were made on August 14, 1959, by the U.S. Explorer 6. The first satellite photographs of the Moon might have been made on October 6, 1959, by the Soviet satellite Luna 3, on a mission to photograph the far side of the Moon. The Blue Marble photograph was taken from space in 1972, and has become very popular in the media and among the public. Also in 1972 the United States started the Landsat program, the largest program for acquisition of imagery of Earth from space. In 1977, the first real time satellite imagery was acquired by the United States's KH-11 satellite system. The most recent Landsat satellite, Landsat 9, was launched on 27 September 2021.

All satellite images produced by NASA are published by NASA Earth Observatory and are freely available to the public. Several other countries have satellite imaging programs, and a collaborative European effort launched the ERS and Envisat satellites carrying various sensors. There are also private companies that provide commercial satellite imagery. In the early 21st century satellite imagery became widely available when affordable, easy to use software with access to satellite imagery databases was offered by several companies and organizations.

Uses 

Satellite images have many applications in meteorology, oceanography, fishing, agriculture, biodiversity conservation, forestry, landscape, geology, cartography, regional planning, education, intelligence and warfare. Less mainstream uses include anomaly hunting, a criticized investigation technique involving the search of satellite images for unexplained phenomena. Images can be in visible colors and in other spectra. There are also elevation maps, usually made by radar images. Image interpretation and analysis of satellite imagery is conducted using specialized remote sensing software.

Data characteristics 

There are five types of resolution when discussing satellite imagery in remote sensing:  spatial, spectral, temporal, radiometric and geometric.  Campbell (2002) defines these as follows:
 spatial resolution is defined as the pixel size of an image representing the size of the surface area (i.e. m2) being measured on the ground, determined by the sensors' instantaneous field of view (IFOV);
 spectral resolution is defined by the wavelength interval size (discrete segment of the Electromagnetic Spectrum) and number of intervals that the sensor is measuring;
 temporal resolution is defined by the amount of time (e.g. days) that passes between imagery collection periods for a given surface location
Radiometric resolution is defined as the ability of an imaging system to record many levels of brightness (contrast for example) and to the effective bit-depth of the sensor (number of grayscale levels) and is typically expressed as 8-bit (0–255), 11-bit (0–2047), 12-bit (0–4095) or 16-bit (0–65,535).
 Geometric resolution refers to the satellite sensor's ability to effectively image a portion of the Earth's surface in a single pixel and is typically expressed in terms of Ground sample distance, or GSD. GSD is a term containing the overall optical and systemic noise sources and is useful for comparing how well one sensor can "see" an object on the ground within a single pixel. For example, the GSD of Landsat is ≈30m, which means the smallest unit that maps to a single pixel within an image is ≈30m x 30m. The latest commercial satellite (GeoEye 1) has a GSD of 0.41 m. This compares to a 0.3 m resolution obtained by some early military film based Reconnaissance satellite such as Corona.

The resolution of satellite images varies depending on the instrument used and the altitude of the satellite's orbit. For example, the Landsat archive offers repeated imagery at 30 meter resolution for the planet, but most of it has not been processed from the raw data. Landsat 7 has an average return period of 16 days. For many smaller areas, images with resolution as fine as 41 cm can be available.

Satellite imagery is sometimes supplemented with aerial photography, which has higher resolution, but is more expensive per square meter. Satellite imagery can be combined with vector or raster data in a GIS provided that the imagery has been spatially rectified so that it will properly align with other data sets.

Imaging satellites

Public domain 
Satellite imaging of the Earth surface is of sufficient public utility that many countries maintain satellite imaging programs. The United States has led the way in making these data freely available for scientific use. Some of the more popular programs are listed below, recently followed by the European Union's Sentinel constellation.

CORONA 
The CORONA program was a series of American strategic reconnaissance satellites produced and operated by the Central Intelligence Agency (CIA) Directorate of Science & Technology with substantial assistance from the U.S. Air Force. The type of imagery is wet film panoramic and it used two cameras (AFT&FWD) for capturing stereographic imagery.

Landsat 
Landsat is the oldest continuous Earth-observing satellite imaging program. Optical Landsat imagery has been collected at 30 m resolution since the early 1980s. Beginning with Landsat 5, thermal infrared imagery was also collected (at coarser spatial resolution than the optical data). The Landsat 7, Landsat 8, and Landsat 9 satellites are currently in orbit.

MODIS 
MODIS has collected near-daily satellite imagery of the earth in 36 spectral bands since 2000. MODIS is on board the NASA Terra and Aqua satellites.

Sentinel 
The ESA is currently developing the Sentinel constellation of satellites. Currently, 7 missions are planned, each for a different application. Sentinel-1 (SAR imaging), Sentinel-2 (decameter optical imaging for land surfaces), and Sentinel-3 (hectometer optical and thermal imaging for land and water) have already been launched.

ASTER
The ASTER is an imaging instrument onboard Terra, the flagship satellite of NASA's Earth Observing System (EOS) launched in December 1999. ASTER is a cooperative effort between NASA, Japan's Ministry of Economy, Trade and Industry (METI), and Japan Space Systems (J-spacesystems). ASTER data is used to create detailed maps of land surface temperature, reflectance, and elevation. The coordinated system of EOS satellites, including Terra, is a major component of NASA's Science Mission Directorate and the Earth Science Division. The goal of NASA Earth Science is to develop a scientific understanding of the Earth as an integrated system, its response to change, and to better predict variability and trends in climate, weather, and natural hazards.

 Land surface climatology—investigation of land surface parameters, surface temperature, etc., to understand land-surface interaction and energy and moisture fluxes
 Vegetation and ecosystem dynamics—investigations of vegetation and soil distribution and their changes to estimate biological productivity, understand land-atmosphere interactions, and detect ecosystem change
 Volcano monitoring—monitoring of eruptions and precursor events, such as gas emissions, eruption plumes, development of lava lakes, eruptive history and eruptive potential
 Hazard monitoring—observation of the extent and effects of wildfires, flooding, coastal erosion, earthquake damage, and tsunami damage
 Hydrology—understanding global energy and hydrologic processes and their relationship to global change; included is evapotranspiration from plants
 Geology and soils—the detailed composition and geomorphologic mapping of surface soils and bedrocks to study land surface processes and earth's history
 Land surface and land cover change—monitoring desertification, deforestation, and urbanization; providing data for conservation managers to monitor protected areas, national parks, and wilderness areas

Meteosat 

The Meteosat-2 geostationary weather satellite began operationally to supply imagery data on 16 August 1981. Eumetsat has operated the Meteosats since 1987.

The Meteosat visible and infrared imager (MVIRI), three-channel imager: visible, infrared and water vapour; It operates on the first generation Meteosat, Meteosat-7 being still active.
The 12-channel Spinning Enhanced Visible and Infrared Imager (SEVIRI) includes similar channels to those used by MVIRI, providing continuity in climate data over three decades; Meteosat Second Generation (MSG).
The Flexible Combined Imager (FCI) on Meteosat Third Generation (MTG) will also include similar channels, meaning that all three generations will have provided over 60 years of climate data.

Private domain 
Several satellites are built and maintained by private companies, as follows.

GeoEye

GeoEye's GeoEye-1 satellite was launched on September 6, 2008. The GeoEye-1 satellite has high resolution imaging system and is able to collect images with a ground resolution of 0.41 meters (16 inches) in panchromatic or black and white mode. It collects multispectral or color imagery at 1.65-meter resolution or about 64 inches.

Maxar

Maxar's WorldView-2 satellite provides high resolution commercial satellite imagery with 0.46 m spatial resolution (panchromatic only). The 0.46 meters resolution of WorldView-2's panchromatic images allows the satellite to distinguish between objects on the ground that are at least 46 cm apart. Similarly Maxar's QuickBird satellite provides 0.6 meter resolution (at nadir) panchromatic images.

Maxar's WorldView-3 satellite provides high resolution commercial satellite imagery with 0.31 m spatial resolution. WVIII also carries a short wave infrared sensor and an atmospheric sensor

Airbus Intelligence

Pléiades constellation is composed of two very-high-resolution (50 centimeters pan & 2.1 meter spectral) optical Earth-imaging satellites. Pléiades-HR 1A and Pléiades-HR 1B provide the coverage of Earth's surface with a repeat cycle of 26 days. Designed as a dual civil/military system, Pléiades will meet the space imagery requirements of European defence as well as civil and commercial needs.
 is the advanced optical constellation, with four identical 30-cm resolution satellites with fast reactivity.

Spot Image

The 3 SPOT satellites in orbit (Spot 5, 6, 7) provide very high resolution images – 1.5 m for Panchromatic channel, 6m for Multi-spectral (R,G,B,NIR). Spot Image also distributes multiresolution data from other optical satellites, in particular from Formosat-2 (Taiwan) and Kompsat-2 (South Korea) and from radar satellites (TerraSar-X, ERS, Envisat, Radarsat). Spot Image is also the exclusive distributor of data from the high resolution Pleiades satellites with a resolution of 0.50 meter or about 20 inches. The launches occurred in 2011 and 2012, respectively. The company also offers infrastructures for receiving and processing, as well as added value options.

Planet's RapidEye

In 2015, Planet acquired BlackBridge, and its constellation of five RapidEye satellites, launched in August 2008. The RapidEye constellation contains identical multispectral sensors which are equally calibrated. Therefore, an image from one satellite will be equivalent to an image from any of the other four, allowing for a large amount of imagery to be collected (4 million km2 per day), and daily revisit to an area. Each travel on the same orbital plane at 630 km, and deliver images in 5 meter pixel size. RapidEye satellite imagery is especially suited for agricultural, environmental, cartographic and disaster management applications. The company not only offers their imagery, but consults their customers to create services and solutions based on analysis of this imagery. The RapidEye constellation was retired by Planet in April 2020.

ImageSat International
Earth Resource Observation Satellites, better known as "EROS" satellites, are lightweight, low earth orbiting, high-resolution satellites designed for fast maneuvering between imaging targets. In the commercial high-resolution satellite market, EROS is the smallest very high resolution satellite; it is very agile and thus enables very high performances. The satellites are deployed in a circular sun-synchronous near polar orbit at an altitude of 510 km (± 40 km).
EROS satellites imagery applications are primarily for intelligence, homeland security and national development purposes but also employed in a wide range of civilian applications, including: mapping, border control, infrastructure planning, agricultural monitoring, environmental monitoring, disaster response, training and simulations, etc.

EROS A – a high resolution satellite with 1.9–1.2m resolution panchromatic was launched on December 5, 2000.

EROS B – the second generation of Very High Resolution satellites with 70 cm resolution panchromatic, was launched on April 25, 2006.

China Siwei 
GaoJing-1 / SuperView-1 (01, 02, 03, 04) is a commercial constellation of Chinese remote sensing satellites controlled by China Siwei Surveying and Mapping Technology Co. Ltd. The four satellites operate from an altitude of 530 km and are phased 90° from each other on the same orbit, providing 0.5m panchromatic resolution and 2m multispectral resolution on a swath of 12 km.

Disadvantages

Because the total area of the land on Earth is so large and because resolution is relatively high, satellite databases are huge and image processing (creating useful images from the raw data) is time-consuming. Preprocessing, such as image destriping, is often required. Depending on the sensor used, weather conditions can affect image quality: for example, it is difficult to obtain images for areas of frequent cloud cover such as mountaintops.  For such reasons, publicly available satellite image datasets are typically processed for visual or scientific commercial use by third parties.

Commercial satellite companies do not place their imagery into the public domain and do not sell their imagery; instead, one must acquire a license to use their imagery. Thus, the ability to legally make derivative works from commercial satellite imagery is diminished.

Privacy concerns have been brought up by some who wish not to have their property shown from above. Google Maps responds to such concerns in their FAQ with the following statement: "We understand your privacy concerns... The images that Google Maps displays are no different from what can be seen by anyone who flies over or drives by a specific geographic location."

See also 

 Aerial photography
 Earth observation satellite
 Moderate-resolution imaging spectroradiometer
 Reconnaissance satellite
 Remote sensing
 Shuttle Radar Topography Mission
 Stratellite
 Timeline of first images of Earth from space
 Virtual globe
 NASA World Wind
 Weather satellite

References

External links

ESA Envisat Meris – 300m – the most detailed image of the entire Earth to date, made by the European Space Agency's Envisat Meris.
Blue Marble: Next Generation – a detailed true-color image of the entire Earth.
World Wind – an open source 3D Earth-viewing software developed by NASA that accesses NASA JPL database

 
Earth observation satellites
Geographic data and information
Photography by genre